Mariano Díez Moreno (2 October 1949 – 18 June 2022) was a Spanish politician.

A member of the People's Alliance, he served in the Cortes of Castilla–La Mancha from 1983 to 1987 and was president of the Provincial Deputation of Toledo from 1987 to 1991.

Díez died in Madrid on 18 June 2022 at the age of 72.

References

1949 births
2022 deaths
20th-century Spanish politicians
Members of the 1st Cortes of Castilla–La Mancha
University of Salamanca alumni
People from Toledo, Spain